Silver Tongues is a 2011 dark drama film directed by Simon Arthur and starring Lee Tergesen and Enid Graham.

Plot
Gerry and Joan (Tergesen and Graham) are a middle-aged couple who travel from town to town under false personas to mutilate and change the lives of any and all unsuspecting victims in their paths. Using their immense acting skill, the duo start to fall apart when their relationship strains under the pressure of their performances.

Cast
 Lee Tergesen as Gerry
 Enid Graham as Joan
 Tate Ellington as Alex
 Emily Meade as Rachel
 Adam LeFevre as Police Chief
 Harvey Kaplan as John Roberts

External links
 

2011 films
2010s erotic drama films
2010s erotic thriller films
2011 independent films
2010s mystery thriller films
2011 psychological thriller films
American erotic drama films
American independent films
American mystery thriller films
American neo-noir films
American erotic thriller films
2011 drama films
2010s English-language films
2010s American films